Missa L'Homme armé is a part of a mass by Giovanni Pierluigi da Palestrina. It was published in 1570 and consists of four movements.

Kyrie
The Kyrie section can be divided into Kyrie I, Christe Eleison and Kyrie II.
Kyrie I
The texture starts small and all five voices eventually enter in imitation. It is duple meter and contains an abundance of thirds and sixths. The Cantus Firmus enters in the tenor in very long note values.
Christe Eleison: It is in duple meter and shows imitative polyphony. the voices also enter here in a well regulated manner and again the Cantus Firmus enters in long notes in the tenor. It includes a descending and ascending interval of a fifth, heard first in the bass, then the first tenor, alto and soprano, with the true augmented version in the second tenor.
Kyrie II
The second Kyrie is written in imitative polyphony in triple meter. Continuing elements of the song appear in the first tenor, soprano, alto and bass, with the second tenor introducing the Cantus Firmus in diminution with halved note-values.

Gloria
The Gloria introduces the opening of the song from the first tenor, which is followed by the soprano, alto and bass. Each voice extends the characteristic opening figure as is imitated by the other voices. The second tenor enters with an augmented version of the unchanged theme and this procedure is followed through the movement.

Sanctus
The Sanctus forms part of the prayer of consecration of the bread and wine. The image of such works usually conclude with words describing the praise of the worshippers joining with the angels, who are pictured as praising God with the words of the Sanctus. In Christianity the Sanctus is offered as a response by the choir during the Holy Anaphora. Composers of the late Renaissance began to work with freer and longer melodic lines. Imitation begins and is used between voices, and each singer's melody fluctuates less in pitch and becomes more tied to the text.

A listening chart explaining the Sanctus:

Agnus Dei
The Agnus Dei is split into two sections. Agnus Dei I and the Agnus Dei II. Palestrina's mass that was analyzed is his first mass based on the l'homme armé melody. This mass was written for five voices and was a regular cantus-firmus mass as many of the l’homme armé masses. It is said that Palestrina composed it during the 1560s which is within his third volume of masses, published in 1570. The use of a cantus firmus mass was outdated by the time Palestrina composed his mass so when he composed this mass he used the modern style of the time. This new view of the cantus fimus mass gave new life to work.

In the Sanctus, the tenor sings the L'homme armé melody beginning on F; on the jubilant text Hosanna, the note values are diminished such that the structural function is hidden. Agnus Dei I continues to rise to the climax which is pitched 'G'. Agnus Dei II begins as if the cantus firmus is present on 'A', but proceeds to a freely composed trio. Agnus Dei III places the now-familiar tune in extremely long notes sung by the highest voice. Beginning on 'A', an indication instructing the soprano to "sing without ceasing" is present, which means, without rests. The other three voices in this movement sing closely woven, motivic, imitative passages around the climatic top voice.

Bibliography
 Vartolo, S. PALESTRINA: Missa L'homme arme / CAVAZZONI: Ricercari. Available at http://www.naxos.com/mainsite/blurbs_reviews.asp?item_code=8.553315&filetype=About%20this%20Recording&language=English
 Palestrina: Kyrie from Missa L'Homme Arme. Available at http://toddtarantino.com/hum/palestrina
 Pierce, T. 2011. Music Literature: Antiquity through Renaissance. Available at http://www.nwmissouri.edu/library/owens/awards/2012/PierceTyler.pdf

References

External links

Compositions by Giovanni Pierluigi da Palestrina
Palestrina